Owingsville Commercial District and Courthouse Square is a historic district in Owingsville, Kentucky which was listed on the National Register of Historic Places in 1978, and was expanded by a boundary increase listing in 1985.

This includes:
Methodist Church (1845)
Colonel Thomas Deye Owings House (1811–14), separately listed on the National Register
more

The increase was to add an Italianate-style building at 122 E. Main.

References

Historic districts on the National Register of Historic Places in Kentucky
Victorian architecture in Kentucky
Italianate architecture in Kentucky
Buildings and structures completed in 1815
National Register of Historic Places in Bath County, Kentucky
1815 establishments in Kentucky